Conospermum wycherleyi is a shrub endemic to Western Australia.

It blooms between July and November producing cream-white flowers.

It is found on sand plains along the west coast in the Mid West and Wheatbelt regions of Western Australia where it grows in sandy soils over laterite.

There are two known of subspecies:
 Conospermum wycherleyi subsp. glabrum
 Conospermum wycherleyi subsp. wycherleyi

References

External links

Eudicots of Western Australia
wycherleyi
Endemic flora of Western Australia
Plants described in 1995